St. Mary's Band or St. Mary's First Nation is one of six Wolastoqiyik or Maliseet Nations on the Saint John River in Canada.

The St. Mary's Band lands comprise two reserves (Saint Mary's # 24, 1 ha; Devon # 30, 131.5 ha). The Saint Mary's reserve, established in 1867, lies on the northeast bank of the Saint John River, opposite downtown Fredericton.  A second, larger reserve, purchased in 1929, lies 3 km NNE of the St. Mary's reservation. Recent (2002) acquisitions have expanded the reserve lands to 308 ha. Roughly half the members of the St. Mary's First Nation reside on the reserve lands.

The founding of the 1867 Reserve is attributed to Gabriel Acquin, a Maliseet hunter, guide and interpreter.

References

External links
Saint Mary's First Nation website

Maliseet
Communities in York County, New Brunswick
Greater Fredericton